Impulse is a 1974 American horror thriller film, starring William Shatner as a serial killer of wealthy widows. Ruth Roman, Kim Nicholas, Jennifer Bishop and Harold Sakata co-star. It was written by Tony Crechales and directed by William Grefé.

The film was first released in Tampa, Florida, on January 31, 1974, where the filming took place. It was subsequently released nationwide in 1974–75, making nearly $4 million in the domestic box office.

Plot

Cast
William Shatner - Matt Stone 
Ruth Roman - Julia Marstow 
Harold Sakata - Karate Pete 
Jennifer Bishop - Ann Moy 
James Dobson - Clarence 
Kim Nicholas - Tina Moy

Production
The working title for the film was Want a Ride, Little Girl? According to the Examiner.com interview, director Grefé cast actors who were located in Miami at the time. He met Shatner at the airport, Bishop was Grefé's friend, and Sakata had a wrestling career there apart from appearing in the James Bond film Goldfinger.

Filming lasted 15 days, including 12 with Shatner and final three with other actors. During one take of the scene where Shatner's character hangs Sakata's character to death, Sakata nearly died of being accidentally hanged by tight rope. Fortunately, with Sakata's "superior neck development", the crew was able to save his life. Shatner broke his finger during the incident while supporting Sakata's weight.

Legacy 
The band Prolapse sampled the line of dialogue "I want you to meet someone. Tina this is- this is Matthew Stone" in their song "Tina This is Matthew Stone" which is the closing track of their debut album Pointless Walks to Dismal Places.

See also
 List of American films of 1974

References

External links
 
 
 
 

1974 films
1974 horror films
1970s horror thriller films
American horror thriller films
Films directed by William Grefe
Films set in Florida
Films shot in Florida
American serial killer films
1970s English-language films
1970s American films